Coleus socotranus, synonym Plectranthus socotranus, is a species of flowering plant in the family Lamiaceae.

It is endemic to Socotra, an East African island that is politically part of Yemen.

Its natural habitats are subtropical or tropical dry forests and rocky areas on the island.

References

socotranus
Endemic flora of Socotra
Least concern plants
Least concern biota of Africa
Taxonomy articles created by Polbot
Taxobox binomials not recognized by IUCN